Cressey may refer to:

People
Cressey (surname)

Places
Cressey, California, a census-designated place in the northern part of Merced County, California

Other uses
Thoma Cressey Bravo, American private equity firm

See also

Cressy (disambiguation)
Crecy (disambiguation)